Tacheta Zougagha is a town in northern Algeria.

Communes of Aïn Defla Province
Cities in Algeria
Algeria